Moyosore Jubril Onigbanjo (born 24 September 1964) is a Nigerian lawyer and a Senior Advocate of Nigeria (SAN). He is the 16th Attorney General and Commissioner for Justice of Lagos State.

Early life and education 
Moyosore Jubril Onigbanjo, was born to a middle-class family on 24 September 1964 in Surulere, Lagos. He attended Sunnyfield Primary school, and later St' Finbarr's College, Yaba, He gained admission and studied law at the University of Ilorin in 1983 but earned his LLB  Hons degree in 1988 from Obafemi Awolowo University, Ile-Ife after the faculty was cancelled at University of Ilorin in 1986 by the National Universities Commission, he then went to Harvard Law School for two Executive Courses on Negotiation and Leadership and thereafter, Difficult Conversation both in 2017.

Career 
He was called to bar by the Nigerian Law School in 1989. Onigbanjo was an NYSC corp member when he cut his legal teeth at Akin Delana & Co. in Ibadan, and then became an associate with Professor A.B Kasumu. He was appointed a Notary Public on March 31, 2001 and later appointed Council Member of the Nigerian Bar Association (NBA) Section on Business Law ( SBL)  on  March 30, 2011, He was a member of the National Executive Committee of the NBA between 2010 and 2012, in September 2013  Hon. Justice Aloma Mariam Mukhtar GCON conferred on him with the rank of Senior Advocate of Nigeria. On August 22 he was sworn in by Governor Babajide Sanwo-Olu as the 16th Attorney General and Commissioner for Justice.

References 

Living people
Lagos State lawyers
University of Ilorin alumni
Obafemi Awolowo University alumni
1964 births